Zone 77 is a zone of the municipality of Al Shamal in the state of Qatar. The main districts recorded in the 2015 population census were Ain Sinan, Fuwayrit and Madinat Al Kaaban, all of which are situated in the eastern section of the municipality. 

Other districts which fall within its administrative boundaries are Al Ghashamiya, Al Huwaila, Al Marroona, Jebel Jassassiyeh, Lejthaya, Umm Al Ghaylam, and Zarqa.

Demographics

Land use
The Ministry of Municipality and Environment (MME) breaks down land use in the zone as follows.

References 

Zones of Qatar
Al Shamal